The yellow-bellied waxbill (Coccopygia quartinia) is a species of estrildid finch native to East Africa. The bird is now named yellow-bellied swee.

It breeds in east central and south-eastern Africa.  Some taxonomists consider it to be conspecific with the swee waxbill.

References

Clements, J. F., T. S. Schulenberg, M. J. Iliff, B.L. Sullivan, C. L. Wood, and D. Roberson. 2012. The eBird/Clements checklist of birds of the world: Version 6.7. Downloaded from 

yellow-bellied waxbill
Birds of East Africa
yellow-bellied waxbill
yellow-bellied waxbill